The Wilisch is a mountain in Saxony, Germany, near Dresden.

References 

Hills of Saxony